{{DISPLAYTITLE:Pi3 Orionis}} 

Pi3 Orionis (π3 Orionis, abbreviated Pi3 Ori, π3 Ori), also named Tabit , is a star in the equatorial constellation of Orion. At an apparent visual magnitude of 3.16, it is readily visible to the naked eye and is the brightest star in the lion's hide (or shield) that Orion is holding. As measured using the parallax technique, it is  distant from the Sun.

Nomenclature 

π3 Orionis (Latinised to Pi3 Orionis) is the system's Bayer designation.

It bore the traditional name of 'Tabit', from the Arabic الثابت al-thābit 'the endurer (the fixed/constant one)'. In 2016, the IAU organized a Working Group on Star Names (WGSN) to catalog and standardize proper names for stars. The WGSN approved the name Tabit for this star on 5 September 2017 and it is now so included in the List of IAU-approved Star Names.

According to Richard Hinckley Allen: Star Names –  Their Lore and Meaning, this star, together with ο1 Orionis, ο2 Orionis, π1 Orionis, π2 Orionis, π4 Orionis, π5 Orionis, π6 Orionis and 6 Orionis (are all of the 4th to the 5th magnitudes and in a vertical line), indicate the lion's skinwere but Al Tizini said that they were the Persians' Al Tāj, "the Crown", or "Tiara", of their kings; and the Arabians' Al Kumm, "the Sleeve", of the garment in which they dressed the Giant, the skin being omitted. Ulugh Beg called them Al Dhawāib, "Anything Pendent"; and the Borgian globe had the same, perhaps originated it. Al Sufi's title was Manica, a Latin term for a protecting Gauntlet; and Grotius gave a lengthy dissertation on the Mantile, which some anonymous person applied to them, figured as a cloth thrown over the Giant's arm.

Properties 

Pi3 Orionis is most likely single; a nearby star is probably an optical companion.

It is a main-sequence star of spectral type F6 V. Since 1943, the spectrum of this star has served as one of the stable anchor points by which other stars are classified. Compared to the Sun, it has about 124% of the mass, 132% of the radius, and nearly 3 times the luminosity.

Although a periodicity of 73.26 days has been observed in the star's radial velocity, it seems likely to be bound more to stellar activity than to a planetary object in close orbit. No substellar companion has been detected so far around Pi3 Orionis and the McDonald Observatory team has set limits to the presence of one or more planets with masses between 0.84 and 46.7 Jupiter masses and average separations spanning between 0.05 and 5.2 astronomical units. Thus, so far it appears that planets could easily orbit in the habitable zone without any complications caused by a gravitationally perturbing body.

See also 
 List of star systems within 25–30 light-years

References

External links 
 

Orion (constellation)
Tabit
Orionis, Pi3
Orionis, 01
F-type main-sequence stars
Suspected variables
033449
0178
1543
030652
BD+05 0762